Title 20 of the United States Code outlines the role of education in the United States Code.
 —Office of Education
 —Teaching of Agricultural, Trade, Home Economics, and Industrial Subjects
 —Smithsonian Institution, National Museums and Art Galleries
 —National Zoological Park
 —Government Collections and Institutions for Research, and Material for Educational Institutions
 —American Printing House for the Blind
 —Vending Facilities for Blind in Federal Buildings
 —Instruction as to Nature and Effect of Alcoholic Drinks and Narcotics
 —Howard University
 —National Training School for Boys
 —National Training School for Girls
 —National Arboretum
 —Foreign and Exchange Students
 —Financial Assistance to Local Educational Agencies
 —School Construction in Areas Affected by Federal Activities
 —Studies and Research On Problems in Education
 —Public Library Services and Construction
 —National Defense Education Program
 —Grants for Teaching in the Education of Handicapped Children
 —Early Education Programs for Handicapped Children
 —School Construction in Areas Affected by Federal Activities
 —Grants For Teaching in the Education by the Deaf
 —National Technical Institute for the Deaf
 —Gallaudet University
 —Higher Education Facilities
 —National Council on the Arts, the National Endowment for the Arts
 —Training and Fellowship Programs for Community Development
 —Grants for Educational Materials, Facilities and Services, and Strengthening of Educational Agencies
 —Pay and Personnel Program for Overseas Teachers
 —Overseas Defense Dependents Education
 —Support and Scholarship in Humanities and Arts; Museum Services
 —Indemnity For Exhibitions of Arts and Artifacts
 —National Vocational Student Loan Insurance
 —Higher Education Resources and Student Assistance
 —International Studies and Research
 —Basic Education for Adults
 —General Provisions Concerning Education
 —Vocational Education
 —Education of Individuals with Disabilities
 —National Commission on Libraries and Information Science
 —Environmental Education
 —Emergency School Aid
 —Assignment or Transportation Of Students
 —Discrimination Based on Sex or Blindness
 —Equal Educational Opportunities and Transportation of Students
 —Consolidation of Education Programs
 —National Reading Improvement Program
 —Harry S Truman Memorial Scholarships
 —American Folklife Preservation
 —Vocational and Technical Education
 —Career Education and Career Development
 —Career Education Incentive
 —Strengthening and Improvement of Elementary and Secondary Schools
 —Department of Education
 —Asbestos School Hazard Detection and Control
 —National Center for the Study of Afro-American History and Culture
 —Elementary and Secondary Education Block Grant
 —Education for Economic Security
Subchapter I - National Science Foundation Science and Engineering Education 
Subchapter II - Education for Economic Security 
Subchapter III - Partnerships in Education for Mathematics, Science, and Engineering 
Subchapter IV - Presidential Awards for Teaching Excellence in Mathematics and Science
Subchapter V - Asbestos School Hazard Abatement
Subchapter VI - Excellence in Education Program 
Subchapter VII - Magnet Schools Assistance
Subchapter VIII - Equal Access
Subchapter IX - Star Schools Program
 —Emergency Immigrant Education Assistance
 —Leadership in Educational Administration
 —Education of the Deaf
 —American Indian, Alaska Native, And Native Hawaiian Culture and Art Development
 —James Madison Memorial Fellowship Program
 —Drug-Free Schools and Communities
 —Barry Goldwater Scholarship and Excellence in Education Program
 —Fund for the Improvement and Reform of Schools and Teaching
 —Education for Native Hawaiians
 —Education and Training for American Competitiveness
 —Eisenhower Exchange Fellowship Program
 —Excellence in Mathematics, Science, and Engineering Education
 —National Environmental Education
 —Morris K. Udall Scholarship and Excellence in National Environmental Policy Foundation
 —Christopher Columbus Fellowship Foundation
 —National Education Reform
 —School-To-Work Opportunities
 —Strengthening and Improvement of Elementary and Secondary Schools
 —National Education Statistics
 —Museum and Library Services
 —Adult Education and Literacy
 —Troops-To-Teachers Program
 —Early Learning Opportunities
 —Education Research, Statistics, Evaluation, Information, and Dissemination
 —Financial Literacy and Education Improvement

References

External links
U.S. Code Title 20, via United States Government Printing Office
U.S. Code Title 20, via Cornell University

Title 20
20
Learning programs